Cyril Irving Davis (December 12, 1896 – June 27, 1958) was an American soccer full back who played professionally with Philadelphia Field Club in the American Soccer League (ASL) from 1924 to 1926. He was born in Stourport-on-Severn, England.  Davis was a member of the U.S. soccer team at the 1924 Summer Olympics. He went on to earn five caps with the U.S. national team in 1924 and 1925. His first game with the U.S. national team came in the U.S. victory over Estonia at the 1924 Olympics. His last game came on June 27, 1926, a 1-0 loss to Canada.  He later went on to play for Fairhill F.C.

External links
 Davis' Soccer Hall of Fame eligibility bio

References

1896 births
1958 deaths
American soccer players
United States men's international soccer players
American Soccer League (1921–1933) players
Philadelphia Field Club players
Olympic soccer players of the United States
Footballers at the 1924 Summer Olympics
People from Stourport-on-Severn
Association football defenders
Sportspeople from Worcestershire